Chișag may refer to the following rivers in Romania:

Chișag, a tributary of the Cugir in Alba County
Chișag, a tributary of the Cormoș in Covasna County